José Antonio de la Ballina Avilés (born 29 April 1964), known as Nené Ballina or simply Nené, is a Spanish football manager and former player. He played as a striker and a attacking midfielder.

Early life
Nené was born in Santa Isabel (now Malabo), Spanish Guinea (now Equatorial Guinea) to Spanish parents who returned to Villaviciosa, Asturias (where his father hails) with him, when he was 3 years old.

Career
Nené managed two scoreless La Liga appearances for Rayo Vallecano in the 1989–90 season.

References

External links
 
 Futbolme profile  
 Navia CF profile 
 historiarealaviles.blogspot.com 
 golplus.es 

1964 births
Living people
Sportspeople from Malabo
Spanish footballers
Association football forwards
Real Oviedo Vetusta players
Real Oviedo players
Real Avilés CF footballers
Rayo Vallecano players
Villarreal CF players
Gimnástica de Torrelavega footballers
Racing de Santander players
Palamós CF footballers
UP Langreo footballers
La Liga players
Spanish football managers
UP Langreo managers
Spanish people of Asturian descent